Since the 1870s, various pieces of colonial legislation in India during British rule were collectively called the Criminal Tribes Act (CTA), which criminalized entire communities by designating them as habitual criminals. Under these acts, ethnic or social communities in India were defined as "addicted to the systematic commission of non-bailable offences" such as thefts, and were registered by the government. Adult males of the groups were forced to report weekly to local police, and had restrictions on their movement imposed.

The first CTA, the Criminal Tribes Act 1871, applied mostly in North India, before it was extended to the Bengal Presidency and other areas in 1876, and updated to the Criminal Tribes Act 1911, which included the Madras Presidency. The Act went through several amendments in the next decade, and, finally, the Criminal Tribes Act 1924 incorporated all of them.

At the time of Indian independence in 1947, thirteen million people in 127 communities faced search and arrest if any member of the group was found outside the prescribed area. The Act was repealed in August 1949 and former "criminal tribes" were denotified in 1952, when the Act was replaced with the Habitual Offenders Act 1952. In 1961 state governments started releasing lists of such tribes.

Today, there are 313 Nomadic Tribes and 198 Denotified Tribes of India, yet the legacy of the past continues to affect the majority of 60 million people belonging to these tribes, as their historical associations have meant continued alienation and stereotyping by the police and the media as well as economic hardships. Many of them are still described as "Ex-Criminal Tribes".

Origins of the act

Sociologist Meena Radhakrishna writes that after the revolt of 1857, many tribal chiefs such as Avantibai Lodhi, and Dhan Singh Gurjar were labelled traitors and considered rebellious.
The colonial government found the demarcation between wandering criminal tribes, vagrants, itinerants, travelling tradesmen, nomads and gypsies difficult to manage, so they were all, even eunuchs (hijras), grouped together, and their subsequent generations were labelled a "law and order problem" for the state.

Nomads vs Settlers

Historian David Arnold has suggested that because many of these tribes were small communities of poor, low-caste and nomadic people living on the fringes of the society, living as petty traders, pastoralists, gypsies, hill and forest dwelling tribes, they did not conform to the prevailing European standards of living, which involved settled agriculture and waged labour. Those with nomadic lifestyles were seen as a menace to 19th century society and required control, or at least surveillance.

Social Engineering

The measure was a part of a wider attempt at social engineering which saw, for example, the categorisation of castes as being "agricultural" or "martial" as a means of facilitating the distribution of property or recognising which groups were loyal to the colonial government and therefore suitable for military recruitment, respectively.

Elsewhere the concept of Reformatory Schools for such people had already been initiated by mid-19th century by social reformers, such as Mary Carpenter (1807–1877), who was the first to coin the term "dangerous classes".

Because it came to be thought that behavior was hereditary rather than learned, crime became ethnic, and what was merely social determinism till then became biological determinism.

History

The colonial government prepared a list of "criminal castes", and all members registered in these castes by caste-census were restricted in terms of regions they could visit, move about in or people they could socialise with. In certain regions, entire caste groups were presumed guilty by birth, arrested, children separated from their parents, and held in penal colonies or quarantined without conviction or due process.

Scope

The Criminal Tribes Act was one of the many laws passed by the British colonial government that applied to Indians based on their religion and caste identification. The Criminal Tribes Act and its provisions used the term Tribes, which included castes within their scope. This terminology was preferred for various reasons, including Muslim sensitivities that considered castes by definition Hindu, and preferred Tribes as a more generic term that included Muslims.

Colonial Justification

When the Bill was introduced in 1871 by British official T.V. Stephens, he said: "... people from time immemorial have been pursuing the caste system defined job-positions: weaving, carpentry and such were hereditary jobs. So there must have been hereditary criminals also who pursued their forefathers’ profession."

James Fitzjames Stephen testified, "When we speak of professional criminals, we...(mean) a tribe whose ancestors were criminals from time immemorial, who are themselves destined by the usage of caste to commit crime, and whose descendants will be offenders against the law, until the whole tribe is exterminated or accounted for in manner of thugs".

Labelling and restrictions
The castes and tribes "notified" under the Act were labelled as Criminal Tribes for their so-called "criminal tendencies". As a result, anyone born in these communities across the country was presumed as a "born criminal", irrespective of their criminal precedents. This gave the police sweeping powers to arrest them, control them, and monitor their movements.

Once a tribe was officially notified, its members had no recourse to repeal such notices under the judicial system. From then on, their movements were monitored through a system of compulsory registration and passes, which specified where the holders could travel and reside, and district magistrates were required to maintain records of all such people.

Colonial Support
The British government was able to summon a large amount of public support, including the nationalist press, for the excesses committed, because the Criminal Tribes Act was posed widely as a social reform measure which reformed criminals through work. However, when they tried to make a living like everybody else, they did not find work outside the settlement because of public prejudice and ostracisation.

Extension
An inquiry was set up in 1883, to investigate the need for extending the Act to the rest of India, and received an affirmative response. 1897 saw another amendment to the Act, wherein local governments were empowered to establish separate "reformatory" settlements, for tribal boys from age four to eighteen years, away from their parents.

Eventually, in 1911, it was enacted in Madras Presidency as well, bringing entire India into the jurisdiction of this law, in 1908, special ‘settlements’ were constructed for the notified tribes where they had to perform hard labour. With subsequent amendments to the Act, punitive penalties were increased, and fingerprinting of all members of the criminal tribe was made compulsory, such tight control according to many scholars was placed to ensure that no future revolts could take place.

Resettlement of tribes
Many of the tribes were "settled" in villages under the police guard, whose job was to ensure that no registered member of the tribe was absent without notice. Also imposition of punitive police posts on the villages with history of "misconduct" was also common.

The Aziz Nagar settlement in South Arcot District was opened on 22 September 1913
to deal with the so-called criminal tribes of the Madras presidency, including Veppur Parayars and Piramalai
Kallar, in South Arcot district. Some of the peoples of Veppur Paraiyar and Piramalai Kallar were arrested under the Criminal Tribes Act and formed the Aziz Nagar settlement. The oppressed people in the Aziz Nagar settlement were without even basic facilities and food. T. M. Jambulingam Mudaliar visited the Aziz Nagar settlement unofficially and provided food and basic necessities to affected people there. Jambulinga Mudaliar vehemently opposed the Criminal Tribes Act, but only the Criminal Tribes Act against the Vanniyar Padayachi of the South Arcot was repealed.

In the coming decades, to evade prosecution under the Act, many of these notified tribes took up nomadic existence, living on the fringes of society.

Victims
Professor of history Ramnarayan Rawat states that the criminal-by-birth castes under this Act included initially Ahir, Gujjar, Gadriya but expanded by the late 19th century to include most of Chamars, as well as Sanyasis and hill tribes. Other major British census based caste groups that were included as criminal-by-birth under this Act included  Bowreah, Budducks, Bedyas, Domes, Dormas, Gujjar, Rebari, Pasi, Dasads, Nonias, Moosaheers, Rajwars, Gahsees Boayas, Dharees, Sowakhyas.

Hundreds of Hindu communities were brought under the Criminal Tribes Act. By 1931, the colonial government listed 237 criminal castes and tribes under the act in the Madras Presidency alone.

Impact on third gender communities 

Though it was primarily directed at tribal communities, various incarnations of the Criminal Tribes Act also included provisions limiting the rights of transgender and gender non-conforming individuals and communities in India. Hijras in particular were targeted under the Act.

The Criminal Tribes Act of 1871 created the category of "eunuch" to refer to the many, often unrelated gender non-conforming communities in India, including hijras, khwajasarais, and kotis. The label "eunuch" was used as a catchall term for anyone thought not to conform to traditional British ideals of masculinity, though in reality most of the communities classified as "eunuchs" did not identify as male or female.

Under the Criminal Tribes Act, a eunuch could be either "respectable" or "suspicious." Respectable eunuchs did not engage in "kidnapping, castration or sodomy," while suspicious eunuchs performed in public and wore what British officials classified as female clothes. The Criminal Tribes Act banned all behaviour considered "suspicious," warning that anyone found engaging in traditional hijra activities like public dancing or dressing in women's clothing would be arrested and/or forced to pay a fine.

Colonial authorities claimed that it was necessary for "eunuchs" to be registered under the Act to prevent them from kidnapping children and/or engaging in sodomy. In reality, there was little official evidence of any gender non-conforming communities in India kidnapping children, or of many children living in gender non-conforming communities. The few children that were found to be living with hijras were removed from their care, despite the fact that most of the children did not have any other legal guardians and had been adopted into the hijra community because they were orphans or unwanted by their biological families.

Reform of the Act

This practice became controversial and did not enjoy the support of all British colonial officials.  Henry Schwarz, a professor at Georgetown University specialising in the history of colonial and postcolonial India, wrote that this decades-long practice was reversed at the start of the 20th century with the proclamation that people "could not be incarcerated indefinitely on the presumption of [inherited] bad character".

In 1936, Jawaharlal Nehru denouncing the Act commented, "The monstrous provisions of the Criminal Tribes Act constitute a negation of civil liberty. No tribe [can] be classed as criminal as such and the whole principle [is] out of consonance with all civilised principles."

Post-independence reforms

In January 1947, Government of Bombay set up a committee, which included B.G. Kher, then Chief Minister Morarji Desai, and Gulzarilal Nanda, to look into the matter of 'criminal tribes'. In 1949, after a long campaign led by Communist leaders such as P. Ramamurthi and P. Jeevanandham, and Forward Bloc leader U. Muthuramalingam Thevar, who had led many agitations in the villages since 1929 urging the people to defy the CTA, the number of tribes listed under the CTA was reduced. Other provincial governments soon followed suit.

The Act was repealed in August 1949, which resulted in 2,300,000 tribals being decriminalised. The committee appointed in the same year by the central government to study the utility of the existence of this law, reported in 1950 that the system violated the spirit of the Indian constitution.

A massive crime wave after the criminal tribes were denotified led to a public outcry.  The Habitual Offenders Act (HOA) (1952) was enacted in the place of CTA; it states that a habitual offender is one who has been a victim of subjective and objective influences and has manifested a set practice in crime, and also presents a danger to society. The HOA effectively re-stigmatised the already marginalised "criminal tribes".

Continued effects

Many of these denotified tribes continued to carry considerable social stigma from the Act, and come under the purview of the new 'Prevention of Anti-Social Activity Act' (PASA).  Many of them have been denied the status of Scheduled Castes (SC), Scheduled Tribes (ST) or Other Backward Classes (OBC), which would have allowed them avail Reservation under Indian law, which reserves seats for them in government jobs and educational institutions, thus most of them are still living Below Poverty Line and in sub-human conditions.<ref name=sus> Frontline, The Hindu, Volume 19 – Issue 12, 8–21 June 2002.</ref>

Over the course of the century since its passing, the criminal identity attached to certain tribes by the Act, was internalised not just by the society, but also by the police, whose official methodology, even after repeal of the Act, often reflected the characteristics of manifestation of an era initiated by the Act, a century ago, where characteristic of crimes committed by certain tribes were closely watched, studied and documented.

The new Act simply relists the "Criminal Tribes" as denotified tribes. Today the social category generally known as the denotified and nomadic tribes includes approximately 60 million people in India.

International opposition

The National Human Rights Commission recommended repeal of the 1952 Habitual Offenders Act in February 2000. Later in March 2007, the UN's anti-discrimination body Committee on the Elimination of Racial Discrimination (CERD), noted that "the so-called denotified and nomadic which are listed for their alleged 'criminal tendencies' under the former Criminal Tribes Act (1871), continue to be stigmatised under the Habitual Offenders Act (1952) (art. 2 (1)), and asked India to repeal the Habitual Offenders Act (1952) and effectively rehabilitate the denotified and nomadic tribes. According to the body, since much of 'Habitual Offenders Act (1952)' is derived from the earlier 'Criminal Tribes Act 1871', it doesn't show a marked departure in its intent, only gives the formed notified tribes a new name i.e. Denotified tribes, hence the stigma continues so does the oppression, as the law is being denounced on two counts, first that "all human beings are born free and equal", and second that it negates a valuable principle of the criminal justice system – innocent until proven guilty.

In 2008, the National Commission for Denotified, Nomadic and Semi-Nomadic Tribes (NCDNSNT) of Ministry of Social Justice and Empowerment recommended that same reservations as available to Scheduled Castes and Scheduled Tribes be extended to around 110 million people of denotified, nomadic or semi-nomadic tribes in India; the commission further recommended that the provisions of the Scheduled Caste and Scheduled Tribe (Prevention of Atrocities) Act, 1989 be applicable to these tribes also. Today, many governmental and non-governmental bodies are involved in the betterment of these denotified tribes through various schemes and educational programs.

In films
At least two short films have made on the situation of denotified tribes in India, first Mahasweta Devi: Witness, Advocate, Writer (2001) by Shashwati Talukdar, a film on the life and works of social activist and Magsaysay Award winner, Mahasweta Devi, who has been working for tribes for over three decades; second, Acting Like a Thief (2005) by P. Kerim Friedman and Shashwati Talukdar, about a Chhara tribal theatre group in Ahmedabad, India.

The 2017 Tamil film Theeran Adhigaaram Ondru is largely based on the criminal acts performed by Bawaria criminal tribes.

The 2021 Tamil film Jai Bhim discusses habituation criminal injustice to the native tribes.

The second season of the Indian streaming series Delhi Crime depicts the still existing prejudice and abuse of "denotified tribes" in Indian police, politics, and society.

References

 Gupta, Charu (18 May 2007). "'Viranganas' and Reinvention of 1857". Economic and Political Weekly. 42 (19): 1742. JSTOR 4419579.

Further reading
 Britain in India, 1765–1905, Volume 1: Justice, Police, Law and Order, Editors: John Marriott and Bhaskar Mukhopadhyay, Advisory Editor: Partha Chatterjee. Published by Pickering and Chatto Publishers, 2006. Full text of Criminal Tribes’ Act, 1871, Act XXVII (1871) p.227-239
 "According to Byju's", Criminal Tribes Act, 1871
 The History of railway thieves: With illustrations & hints on detection (The criminal tribes of India series), by M. Pauparao Naidu. Higginbothams. 4th edition. 1915.
 The land pirates of India;: An account of the Kuravers, a remarkable tribe of hereditary criminals, their extraordinary skill as thieves, cattle-lifters & highwayman & c, and their manners & customs, by William John Hatch. Pub. J.B. Lippincott Co. 1928. ASIN B000855LQK.
 The Criminal Tribes: A Socio-economic Study of the Principal Criminal Tribes and Castes in Northern India, by Bhawani Shanker Bhargava. Published by Published for the Ethnographic and Folk Culture Society, United Provinces, by the Universal Publishers, 1949.
 The Ex-criminal Tribes of India, by Y. C. Simhadri. Published by National, 1979.
 Crime and criminality in British India, by Anand A. Yang. Published for the Association for Asian Studies by the University of Arizona Press, 1985. .
 Creating Born Criminals, by Nicole Rafter. University of Illinois Press. 1998. .
 Branded by Law: Looking at India's Denotified Tribes, by Dilip D'Souza. Published by Penguin Books, 2001. .
 The Strangled Traveler: Colonial Imaginings and the Thugs of India, by Martine van Woerkens, tr. by Catherine Tihanyi. University Of Chicago Press. 2002. .
 Legible Bodies: Race, Criminality and Colonialism in South Asia, by Clare Anderson. Berg Publishers. 2004. .
 The Criminal Tribes in India, by S.T. Hollins. Published by Nidhi Book Enclave. 2005. .
 Notes On Criminal Tribes Residing In Or Frequenting The Bombay Presidency, Berar, And The Central Provinces (1882), by E. J. Gunthorpe. Kessinger Publishing, LLC. 2008. .
 
 Mark Brown (2001), Race, science and the construction of native criminality in colonial India. Theoretical criminology, 5(3), pp. 345–368

 Andrew J. Major (1999), State and Criminal Tribes in Colonial Punjab: Surveillance, Control and Reclamation of the ‘Dangerous Classes’, Modern Asian Studies, 33(3), pp. 657–688
 Kaaval Kottam (காவல் கோட்டம்): by Su. Venkatesan. Published by Tamizhini. Winner of Sahitya Academy Award for 2011. Describes the Thathanoor Kallar and their lives.

External links
 National Commission for denotified, Nomadic & Semi-nomadic Tribes, Official website Ministry of Social Justice and Empowerment Text of Criminal Tribes Act 1871 at Columbia University''

1871 in British law
Indian caste legislation
Legislation in British India
Repealed Indian legislation
Legal history of Pakistan
Legal history of India
Denotified tribes of India
Discrimination in India
Human rights abuses in India
Social history of India
1871 in India
1870s in British India
LGBT-related legislation
Persecution of LGBT people
Transgender rights